Soyuz MS-04 was a Soyuz spaceflight that launched on 20 April 2017 to the ISS. It transported two members of the Expedition 52 crew to the International Space Station. Soyuz MS-04 was the 133rd flight of a Soyuz spacecraft. The crew consisted of a Russian commander and an American flight engineer. It was the first of the Soyuz MS series to rendezvous with the Station in approximately 6 hours, instead of the 2 day orbital rendezvous used for the previous launches. It was also the first Soyuz to launch with only 2 crew members since Soyuz TMA-2.

Crew

Backup crew 

Due to a decision to cut down the number of participating Russian astronauts in 2017, only two astronauts were launched on Soyuz MS-04. Originally set to include 3 people, the crew assignments were changed in November 2016 by NASA and Roscosmos.

Original crew 

Alexander Misurkin and Mark T. Vande Hei were reassigned to Soyuz MS-06 and served as part of Expedition 53/54, Nikolai Tikhonov was reassigned to Soyuz MS-10 to serve as part of Expedition 57/58 although was also pulled of that mission due to the same budget cuts.

References

External links 

Crewed Soyuz missions
Spacecraft launched in 2017
2017 in Russia
Spacecraft launched by Soyuz-FG rockets
Spacecraft which reentered in 2017